Hans-Dieter Schulten (born 11 December 1940) is a German middle-distance runner. He competed in the men's 3000 metres steeplechase at the 1972 Summer Olympics.

References

1940 births
Living people
Athletes (track and field) at the 1972 Summer Olympics
German male middle-distance runners
German male steeplechase runners
Olympic athletes of West Germany
Place of birth missing (living people)